Eochaidh Ó hÉoghusa (1567–1617) was a well-known Irish bardic poet.

Life

Among his most well-known works are several poems included in the Leabhar Branach, a literary compendium of mostly Gaelic poets of Leinster, dedicated to the O'Byrne chiefs of Wicklow who "by their success in maintaining the independence and integrity of their mountainous territory against great odds until the final collapse, they were in a position to attract poets of repute from distant parts of Ireland."

Selected works
Some of his compositions include:

See also
 Filí, the elite bardic poet class of Gaelic Ireland
 Aodh Mág Uidhir, Lord of Fermanagh, and a patron of Ó hÉoghusa

References

Further reading
 Filíocht Ghrá na Gaeilge/Love Poems in Irish (eag/ed.) Ciarán Mac Murchaidh, 2008; 
 An Leabhar Mòr/The Great Book of Gaelic, ed. Theo Dorgan and Malcolm Maclean, 2008.

External links
 CELT: Corpus of Electronic Texts
 CELT Index of Published Irish Texts: Bardic Poetry

Irish poets
1567 births
1617 deaths
Irish-language poets
16th-century Irish writers
17th-century Irish writers
17th-century Irish poets
People of Elizabethan Ireland